Congleton Town Council is the town council for Congleton which was established in 1980.

Councillors 
The current list of councillors in Congleton Town Council, following the local elections on 2 May 2019.

The table below shows current and former compositions of the council.

References

External links

Town Councils in Cheshire
Local precepting authorities in England
Town Council